Ngoli Onyeka Okafor (born December 30, 1974) is an American-born Nigerian actor, former boxer and model who is arguably the internet's most downloaded black male model. Okafor is currently living in New York, New York.

Early life and education
Okafor was born in Framingham, Massachusetts as the second child to a middle-class family when his father was completing his PhD program at Harvard University. His family moved home to Nigeria shortly before Okafor's second birthday. He moved back to the states in the summer of 1994. After completing his basic and secondary school education in Enugu, Nigeria, he proceeded to the University of Connecticut in 1994 where he studied Computer Science before he got employed with the Connecticut Department of Transportation.

Career

Modeling
After losing his job as an I.T specialist at the Connecticut Department of Transportation, Ngo took to modelling and has since gone on to be featured on cover pages of notable magazines like Fortune, Vogue, W, ESPN Magazine and The Source.

Boxing
Ngo's boxing career began in October 2005 at the age of 31 after he developed interest in the sport while doing simple workouts at a boxing gym. He participated and won two back-to-back Golden Gloves Championships in 2008 and 2009.

Acting
Ngo began acting after being involved with T.V commercials and has gone on to star in movies, soaps and television series including Law & Order: Special Victims Unit, One Life to Live and Oxford Gardens.

Filmography

Films
 Phat Girlz (2006)
 Jeremy Fink and the Meaning of Life (2011)
 A Dog Named Gary (2012)
 True Story (2015)
 Oxford Gardens (2015)

TV series
 One Life to Live (2006)
 Six Degrees (2007)
 Kings (2009)
 CollegeHumor Originals (2011)
 The Six (2011)
 Law & Order: Special Victims Unit (2012)
 Law & Order: Special Victims Unit (2018)

References

External links
 Official website
 

1974 births
Living people
Male actors from Massachusetts
Nigerian male film actors
University of Connecticut alumni
American people of Nigerian descent
Boxers from Massachusetts
American male boxers
American male models
Male models from Massachusetts
Sportspeople from Framingham, Massachusetts
American people of Igbo descent
Nigerian male models
Nigerian media personalities
Igbo male models
Igbo male actors